The 1997 Little League World Series took place between August 18 and August 23 in Williamsport, Pennsylvania. The Linda Vista Little League of Guadalupe, Nuevo León, Mexico, defeated South Mission Viejo Little League of Mission Viejo, California, in the championship game of the 51st Little League World Series. Mexico made a dramatic come-from-behind win by staging a 4-run rally in the bottom of sixth inning capped by a single by Pablo Torres.

Qualification

Pool play

August 18

August 19

August 20

Elimination round

Notable players
Lastings Milledge (Bradenton, Florida) - Outfielder for the Tokyo Yakult Swallows
Daniel Baca (Guadalupe, México) - Pitcher for the Broncos de Reynosa LMB

Footnotes

External links
1997 official results via Wayback Machine

Little League World Series
Little League World Series
Little League World Series
Little League World Series